HMS Ganymede was a British prison hulk which was moored in Chatham Harbour in Kent, England. HMS Ganymede was the former French 450 ton frigate Hébé (20 guns, pierced for 34), which, under command of Lieutenant Bretonneuire, was captured by the British frigate Loire on 6 February 1809 while en route from Bordeaux to San Domingo, carrying 600 barrels of flour.
Renamed Ganymede, she served with the Royal Navy before being decommissioned. She was converted to a prison hulk in 1819 and later broken up in 1838.

See also
List of British prison hulks

References

Prison ships